is a manga series written by Meito Banjō and illustrated by Seiji Wakayama, published in Kodansha's Magazine Special.

The manga was adapted into an animated television series in 2007. The Studio Deen production aired on TV Tokyo from October 2, 2007 to March 25, 2008, totaling 25 episodes. It is based on the story from the first volumes of the manga.

Plot 
Thirty years prior to the events of the series, the city of Tokyo was destroyed in a massive earthquake. From the ruins of the former megalopolis, Kyuto was established. In this new city, supernatural occurrences are progressively increasing and the only one capable of unraveling them is Hyuuga Mayuki, a boy detective and esper.

Characters

Main characters 

A twelve-year-old boy with what seems to be extraordinary problem-solving skills.  The police are unable to pull anything out from his background, which seems to be purposely hidden.  He has never attended school before and appears to be a genius in all subjects with the exception of physical education. It is later revealed that he has the power of Shinchi, a power given to the new head of the Hyuuga family. He's the head of the Hyuuga family. His appearance is very innocent and doll-like, with blond hair and blue eyes. 

Mayuki's butler.  Seiran was once called a "doll user" by Byakko during one of their encounters.  He also is found occasionally in a secret base of some sort, where he can keep a close eye on Kyuto's happenings, as well as Mayuki's whereabouts. He belongs to the family of Shinano, a family that supports the Hyuuga family. He made a promise to Mayuki's mother that he'll always protect Mayuki. He's Shien and Seiju's brother and Mayuki's uncle in reality. 

Mayuki's maid.  Mayuki once said that Hatsumi is always in a hurry to find him in the house that she trips over her own feet, which she will subsequently let out an outrageous scream.  It is later revealed that she is one of the two "dolls" that Seiran controls. When in her aya or doll form she fights using her hair as a whip.

Minori's busty older sister. Sanae is always looking to join in an adventure with Mayuki and his friends. It is later revealed that she is one of the two "dolls" that Seiran controls. When in her aya or doll form she uses a pair of claws to fight.

Minori is one of the first friends Mayuki made when he first entered school. She appears to be infatuated with Mayuki and can sometimes be seen competing with Yaya over Mayuki's affection.

Commonly known as "Yaya" or "Yayako." She appears to be suffering from asthma, but it was found out that she was actually suffering from Mineral Dust Allergy that is caused by pollution in the Industrial Center, where she lives. Yaya seems to be recovering after the trial. She appears to be infatuated with Mayuki and can sometimes be seen competing with Minori over Mayuki's affection.

Rakuta is the older brother among the twins. He is very calm and calculating and always keeps his cool. He can predict events what will happen in the near future.

Kota is the younger brother among the twins. Compared to Rakuta, he is more hot-headed and doesn't think much before he acts.  He appears to be infatuated with Yaya, but often sees her going after Mayuki, which causes Kouta to envy him.

A female detective that was skeptical of Mayuki when they first met. Miyako has given Mayuki a certain degree of respect after clearing up some suspicion around him.  She can be seen to be fairly concerned about him if given any information of Mayuki being in danger.

He is a male detective whom Tomaru is always accompanied with in every phantom case together with Mayuki. He is also a close friend of Mayuki. He can be seen always serious and quite making fun when Tomaru is in serious mood.

Minor characters
Shara Hyūga
Mayuki's mother. They share the same hair and eye color. She left Mayuki under the care of Seiran. She lives in Switzerland.

Mayuki's dog. He's a large dog with white fur. He always goes with Mayuki and his friends. 

He's Seiran's older brother. Seiran hated him at first but understood him at the end. He's childish and irritating. He's the new headmaster of the school Mayuki attends. He lives in Switzerland and protects Shara. He went to Japan to check on his brother Seiran and to make sure Mayuki is alright. He is also a doll user.
Yoko
She's Shien's "Aya" and Byakko's older sister. She also serves as the secretary of the headmaster of the school Mayuki attends. She usually carries a harisen with her and uses it on Shien if he irritates or annoys her.

Antagonists 

A mysterious woman who is looking for the power of immortality. She is later revealed to be Seiju's "Aya". When she was still young her older sister, Yoko, left her to become Shien's "Aya". This incident depressed her a lot so she decided to join Seiju, thus, becoming his doll.

He is Mayuki's father. He's the former head of the Hyuuga family before Mayuki. He's born in the Shinano family but because of his extrasensory perception, the Hyuga family adopted him to have an heir. After Mayuki was born, he became nothing. Because of that, he did bad things. He is jealous of Mayuki because he wanted Mayuki's power. He's Seiran and Shien's brother in reality. He is also a doll user.

Media

Episodes

Music 
 Opening theme
  by Kannivalism
 Ending themes
  by Shiita Ө (episodes 1–13)
 "Lovers' tone" by me ho (episodes 14–25)

References

External links 
 Official manga website 
 Official TV series website 
 

2006 manga
Kodansha manga
Occult detective anime and manga
Shōnen manga
TV Tokyo original programming
Studio Deen